Backyard Basketball is a series of entries into the Backyard Sports franchise of video games. The first game was developed by Humongous Entertainment and published by Infogrames for Microsoft Windows and Mac platforms in 2001. Additional games have been released on a variety of consoles, each sporting different characters and slightly altered gameplay mechanics.

As with the other entries into the Backyard Sports franchise, Backyard Basketball has received notoriety for its inclusion of pro basketball players as playable characters. The first incarnation included Kevin Garnett and Lisa Leslie. The most recent release includes Stephen Curry as its mascot.

Gameplay
Backyard Basketball offers two primary modes of gameplay: Single Game, which allows the player to select a team to compete against a computer-controlled team, and Season Play, which allows the player to select a team to compete against a series of computer-controlled teams over an 18-game season, including two best-of-three playoff series and a best-of-five championship series should the player achieve a large number of victories. The Single Game mode also allows the player to compete against a second player or to practice using a single character.

Before games can occur, the player has the option to modify a variety of settings. These include court selection, A.I. difficulty (easy, medium, or hard), the presence of certain rules (fouls, fatigue, violations, shot control, and power-ups), sound options (game music, background sounds, and in-game dialogue), controls, and team names. Team modification also involves the customization of jerseys.

The game's controls are set to mouse usage by default, capitalizing on a point & click style of gameplay to move characters around. The game is also compatible with keyboards and game pads.

The selection of team members follows one of two settings: First Five Picks, which allows each player to select their team members freely, or Full Draft, which forces each player to select their team members one at a time in an alternating fashion. Each potential team member, including younger versions of Kevin Garnett and Lisa Leslie, is ranked according to five statistics operating on a 1 to 10 scale. These include Inside Shooting (the relative accuracy of the character's shot from inside the three-point line), Outside Shooting (the relative accuracy of the character's shot from beyond the three-point line), Ballhandling (the relative likelihood that the character will not have the ball stolen or blocked on offense), Defense (the relative likelihood that the character will be able to steal or block the ball on defense), and Quickness (the relative speed at which the character moves along the court). Players also have the option to customize rookie characters with either manually chosen or randomly allocated statistics, as well as heights, skin tones, shooting hands, birthdays, and names. Although rookie characters generally have lower overall statistics compared to pre-rendered players, they have the additional ability to increase all of their statistics by three levels should the player's team make the playoffs in Season Play.

Gameplay in Backyard Basketball is set to a point & click control scheme by default. With three characters on the court at one time, the player clicks at various locations on the court to guide the character with the ball to that location. Clicking on a teammate causes the character to pass the ball to that teammate while clicking the basket (indicated by a basketball icon) causes the character to attempt a shot. If shot control is on, then players have the option to make the shooting character pump fake by clicking rapidly, finally shooting the ball when the click is held down. If shot control is off, then the character will automatically release the shot once the basketball icon is clicked. On defense, the player can switch between characters to control by clicking on them as they run about, guiding the chosen character by clicking the location on the court where he or she should go. If an opposing character is clicked when an 'X' symbol hovers by them, the character nearest him or her will attempt to steal the ball. If a pair of hands appears near the basket when an opposing character goes to shoot the ball, the nearest character will attempt to block the shot or rebound the ball.

Each quarter of a game lasts approximately three minutes while each overtime period (if necessary) lasts approximately one minute. The longer characters play without rest, the more tired and prone to mistakes (poor shooting and ball-handling) they will be; as such, substitutions can be made after any completed play or during a time-out. Characters will recover their energy while on the bench (only two players can stay on the bench at a time). Granted, a character's energy will never decrease if the fatigue option is turned off.

Over the course of a game, power-ups may occasionally be rewarded to teams. The majority of these power-ups are useful, such as the flaming ball (which guarantees that the next attempted shot will go in), the tornado (which increases the speed of all characters on the court), the doughnut (which causes the next character who attempts a shot to automatically attempt a slam dunk), and 110% Juice (which provides energy to otherwise tired players if the fatigue option is turned on). However, some power-ups provide detrimental effects, such as the icy ball (which makes shots more likely to miss), the stick of butter (which reduces the team's ball-handling abilities), and the ice cream truck (which prevents the entire team from moving for a brief period of time).

Releases
Backyard Basketball games have been released numerous times to a variety of platforms. The first game of the series was intended to be released for Windows and Macintosh in 1999, but production was delayed to 2001 and Backyard Football got released in its original slot. Kevin Garnett (the game's primary mascot), and Lisa Leslie appear as pros.

In 2004, a game was released for the Game Boy Advance, PlayStation 2, and PC, featuring Tim Duncan as its primary mascot. The PlayStation 2 version was released in Europe under the name of Junior Sports Basketball, although it lacked any license from the NBA, and the Backyard Kids were redubbed with British voice actors (a lot of the characters were even renamed).

The game was released yet again in 2007, this time for the GameCube and Nintendo DS as well as the aforementioned systems, featuring Paul Pierce as its primary mascot.

The game has most recently been released in early 2015, as a mobile app featuring Stephen Curry as its primary mascot. Only ten of the original Backyard Kids appeared in that version, along with 14 pro players. In this version, Season Play was removed as an option.

2007

Backyard Basketball 2007 is a sports game released late 2006. This is the fifth iteration of the Backyard the game is Paul Pierce of the Boston Celtics. It was released for Microsoft Windows, PlayStation 2, Game Boy Advance and Nintendo DS. A planned release for the GameCube was cancelled.

Reception
In the United States, the debut version of Backyard Basketball sold 780,000 copies and earned $13.2 million by August 2006, after its release in October 2001. It was the country's 15th best-selling computer game between January 2000 and August 2006. Combined sales of all Backyard Sports games released between January 2000 and August 2006, including Backyard Basketball, had reached 5.3 million units in the United States by the latter date.

Backyard Basketball has received low to mixed reviews throughout its multiple releases. Ivan Sulic of IGN awarded the original version a score of 6.5 out of 10, complimenting the simplistic gameplay and colorful graphics while lamenting the amount of crashes that the game is susceptible to encountering. Chris Adams of IGN awarded the 2007 Nintendo DS version the same score, commenting that the addition of new gameplay modes offered more variety.

References

External links
 
 
 

2001 video games
Basketball video games
Game Boy Advance games
Game Boy Advance-only games
Humongous Entertainment games
Infogrames games
Atari games
Classic Mac OS games
Nintendo DS games
Nintendo DS-only games
PlayStation 2 games
Cancelled GameCube games
Video games developed in Canada
Video games developed in the United States
Windows games